Juan Carlos Rojas Villegas (born 22 December 1981) is a Costa Rican cyclist, who is currently suspended from the sport following a positive drugs test at the 2017 Vuelta Ciclista a Costa Rica. He won the 2013–14 UCI America Tour.

Major results

2004
 10th Overall Vuelta Ciclista a Costa Rica
1st Stage 7
2005
 1st Overall Vuelta Ciclista a Costa Rica
1st Prologue, Stages 4, 5 (ITT) & 13
2006
 1st Overall Vuelta a Guatemala
1st Stages 8 & 9
 2nd Road race, National Road Championships
 3rd Overall Vuelta Ciclista a Costa Rica
2007
 1st  Road race, National Road Championships
 1st Stage 2 (TTT) Tour of Nicaragua
2009
 1st Overall Vuelta a Guatemala
1st Stages 3 & 6 (ITT)
 4th Overall Vuelta Ciclista a Costa Rica
1st Stage 12
 5th Overall Vuelta al Ecuador
2010
 1st  Overall Vuelta Ciclista a Costa Rica
1st Stages 3, 6, 7 (ITT), 11 (ITT) & 12
 3rd Road race, National Road Championships
2011
 3rd Overall Vuelta Ciclista a Costa Rica
2013
 1st  Overall Vuelta Ciclista a Costa Rica
1st  Points classification
1st  Mountains classification
1st Stages 3, 7 (ITT), 10, 11 (ITT) & 12
2014
 1st 2013–14 UCI America Tour
 1st  Road race, National Road Championships
 1st  Overall Vuelta Ciclista a Costa Rica
1st  Points classification
1st Stages 8 & 10
2015
 1st  Overall Vuelta Ciclista a Costa Rica
 2nd Time trial, National Road Championships
 9th Overall Tour do Rio
2016
 National Road Championships
1st  Time trial
2nd Road race
 2nd Overall Vuelta a Costa Rica
1st Stages 7 & 11
2017
1st  Overall Vuelta Ciclista a Costa Rica
1st Stages 4, 5 (ITT) & 10

References

External links

1981 births
Living people
Costa Rican male cyclists